Julius Schiller (c. 1580 – 1627) was a lawyer from Augsburg, who like his fellow citizen and colleague Johann Bayer published a star atlas in celestial cartography. 

In the year of his death, Schiller, with Bayer's assistance, published the star atlas Coelum Stellatum Christianum which replaced the pagan names of constellations with biblical and early Christian figures. Specifically, Schiller replaced the zodiacal constellations with the twelve apostles, the northern constellations by figures from the New Testament and the southern constellations by figures from the Old Testament. 

The planets, sun and moon were also replaced by biblical figures. 

Lucas Kilian was the artist who engraved the plates.

The star atlas was considered merely a curiosity and, in contrast to Bayer's Uranometria, did not gain wide acceptance.
Harmonia Macrocosmica by Andreas Cellarius (1660) included star maps for Schiller's constellations after the pagan ones.

External links
Schiller's 1627 Coelum Stellatum Christianum & Coelum Stellatum Christianum Concavum ("Christian Starry Heavens") - Full digital facsimile, Linda Hall Library.
Coelum Stellatum Christianum, Augusta 1627 da www.atlascoelestis.com

1580s births
1627 deaths
17th-century German astronomers
Scientists from Augsburg
17th-century German lawyers